Teikhang is a village in the Saitual district of Mizoram, India. It is located in the Ngopa R.D. Block.

Precipitation

In the year 2015, at Teikhang Village, the amount of rainfall 
is measured by the students of Govt. Teikhang High School.
One of the students, Vanlalmuanpuia had completed to take
complete data for rainfall in the locality. In his data,
the rainfall is approximately correct to as it was believed
and estimated by the other agents like accuweather.com.

The data collected by him was as below:
SN	Date		Ini. reading	Final reading 
Amount of rainfall:

1	12/06/2015	0	300	300 ml
2	19/06/2015	300	600	300 ml
3	26/06/2015	600	1100	500 ml
4	03/07/2015	1100	1300	200 ml
5	10/07/2015	1300	2160	860 ml
6	17/07/2015	2160	2280	120 ml
7	24/07/2015	2280	2305	25 ml
8	31/07/2015	2305	2320	15 ml
9	07/08/2015	2320	2530	210 ml
10	14/08/2015	2530	2730	200 ml
11	21/08/2015	2730	2985	255 ml
12	28/08/2015	2985	3035	50 ml
13	04/09/2015	3035	3085	50 ml
14	11/09/2015	3085	3165	80 ml
15	18/09/2015	3165	3600	435 ml
16	25/09/2015	3600	3865	265 ml
17	02/10/2015	3865	4225	360 ml 
18	09/10/2015	4225	4975	750 ml 
19	16/10/2015	4975	5475	500 ml
20	23/10/2015	5475	5475	0 ml
21	30/11/2015	5475	5690	215 ml
22	06/11/2015	5690	5890	200 ml
					
					5890 ml

Note: Before the starting date and after 6 November 2015,
no rainfall had been recorded. So, during this year,
the rainfall can be estimated from the above data only.
Calculation:
Average rainfall per month =  = 490.83 ml per month

Demographics 

According to the 2011 census of India, Teikhang has 325 households. The effective literacy rate (i.e. the literacy rate of population excluding children aged 6 and below) is 87.35%.

References 

Villages in Ngopa block